Loca por el trabajo is a 2018 Mexican comedy film directed by Luis Eduardo Reyes. The story revolves around Alicia (Bárbara de Regil), a successful workaholic executive, who puts her company's needs before her family's needs, and her struggle to balance her work and coexistence with her son. It premiered on 16 November 2018 in Mexico.

Cast 
 Bárbara de Regil as Alicia
 Adriana Barraza as Mercedes
 Marianna Burelli as Marcela
 Alberto Guerra as Leonardo
 Hernán Mendoza as Braulio
 Martha Claudia Moreno as Rosa
 Julio Bekhor as Gerente Banco
 Regina Blandón as Fabiana
 Daniel Tovar as Rosendo

References

External links 
 

Mexican comedy films
2018 comedy films
2010s Mexican films